Queanbeyan Parish is a parish of Murray County, New South Wales, a cadastral unit for use on land titles. It covers the city of Queanbeyan. It was originally bounded by the Molonglo River to the north, but is now bounded by the NSW-ACT border in the north and west. Parts of the western area of the parish were transferred to the Australian Capital Territory in 1909, including what are now the Canberra suburbs of Fyshwick, Narrabundah, Kingston, Oaks Estate, Harman and part of Hume.

References
Draft assessment of crown land at Queanbeyan, Parish of Queanbeyan
Map showing proposed Federal Capital Territory and tenures of land within same, Charles Robt. Scrivener, 22 May 1909

Parishes of Murray County
Queanbeyan–Palerang Regional Council